Camallanus lacustris is a species of freshwater parasitic roundworm in the family Camallanidae. Definitive hosts are fish and intermediate hosts are copepods.

References 

 Advances in Parasitology, Volume 20, R. Muller and J.R. Baker, 1982

External links 

 

Nematodes described in 1776
Camallanida
Parasitic nematodes of animals
Parasitic nematodes of fish
Parasites of crustaceans